Syväjärvi  is a name for 108 lakes in Finland with no less surface than one hectare. The total area covered by all the Syväjärvis is 39,32 km2, on the average 0,36 km2.

Location

Inari
Syväjärvi (Inari) 5

References 

Lakes of Finland